Pamela Anderson (born 1967) is a Canadian-American actress and model.

Pamela Anderson may also refer to:

Pamela Anderson (politician), American politician from North Dakota
Pamela K. Anderson, director of the International Potato Center (Centro Internacional de la Papa)
Pamela Sue Anderson (1955–2017), American philosopher
Pamela Andersson (born 1965), Swedish journalist

See also
Pernella Anderson (1903–1980), African American interviewer for the Federal Writers' Project